The Pets may refer to:

The Pets (1950s band)
The Pets (2000s band)

See also
Els Pets, a Catalan pop rock band